Leányfalu is a riverside village in Pest county, Budapest metropolitan area, Hungary. Located between the branch of the Little Danube (Kis-Duna) and the spurs of the Visegrád Mountains, Leányfalu stretches some 5 kilometres in length. It was declared a holiday resort in 1936 and became an independent municipality in 1949.

To visit Leányfalu from Budapest, take the local Volán buses on the Budapest Újpest-Városkapu – Tahitótfalu – Visegrád – Esztergom line, which leaves around one to three times per hour. By automobile, take route 11 passing through Szentendre.

Trivia 
 Some of the best Hungarian writers, artists, and musicians have retreated to Leányfalu.
 The village received media attention in the Ciaran Tobin extradition case.

Gallery

References

External links
 
 Leányfalu Link Collection (Hungarian Only)

Populated places in Pest County